Chen Xiuke (born 31 December 1976 in Dongfang, Hainan) is a male Chinese sports sailor. He competed for Team China at the 2008 Summer Olympics.

His original English name, Buddy Chen, was changed to Sugar Chen by his American coach's mother-in-law due to the similarity between this and the pronunciation of his Chinese name.

Major performances
2003 National Champions Tournament - 4th 470 class;
2004 Asian Championships - 8th 470 class;
2005 National Games - 7th 470 class

1976 births
Living people
Chinese male sailors (sport)
Olympic sailors of China
Sportspeople from Hainan
Sailors at the 2008 Summer Olympics – Tornado
People from Dongfang
21st-century Chinese people